Bean sprouts chicken (Cantonese transliteration: Ngah Choi Kai; or Malay: Taugeh Ayam) is a dish similar to Hainanese chicken rice, the only difference being the dish comes with a plate of beansprouts. The steamed chicken is served with light soy sauce flavoured with oil. 

People usually eat rice as an accompaniment; however sometimes people can also choose to accompany the chicken and bean sprout with a bowl of flat white noodles (Cantonese transliteration: Hor Fun) (Simplified Chinese: 河粉) clear chicken soup.

Distribution 
This dish can be found in Ipoh, Malaysia where the bean sprouts are known to be crunchy and succulent, thanks to the hard water from the limestone hills.

See also
 Malaysian cuisine
 Ipoh cuisine
 List of chicken dishes

External links
 https://web.archive.org/web/20160314020819/http://friedchillies.com/fc/more.php?id=1540_0_1_0

Malaysian chicken dishes
Ipoh